Elphinstone Tower, also known as Dunmore Tower or Airth Tower, is a ruined tower house on the Dunmore Estate in central Scotland. The 16th-century ruin is protected as a category C(S) listed building.

History

The tower dates to the early 16th century, when it was built by Sir John Elphinstone as the seat of the barony of Elphinstone. Alexander Elphinstone, 4th Lord Elphinstone added a gallery and a new hall before his death in 1638.

The Elphinstone Estate was purchased for £16,000 by John Murray, son of the 3rd Earl of Dunmore, in 1754.  Two years later he inherited the earldom, and renamed the estate Dunmore after his title. Lord Dunmore built the famous Dunmore Pineapple elsewhere on the estate in 1761. The tower was extended at some point, although there is little evidence that it was occupied. In the 1820s the 5th Earl commissioned the building of Dunmore Park as the principal residence on the estate. The additions to the tower were demolished to allow construction of St Andrew's Episcopal Church, a private chapel completed around 1850. The tower was subsequently restored and the ground floor remodelled as a family burial vault.

The Murray family left Dunmore in 1911, and the tower has since decayed. St Andrew's Church was demolished in the early 1960s, and the north-west angle of the tower collapsed after a storm around 1968.

See also
Dunmore, Falkirk, estate village

References

Category C listed buildings in Falkirk (council area)
Ruined castles in Falkirk (council area)